Tomás Gutiérrez Ramírez (born 21 December 1969) is a Mexican politician from the National Action Party. From 2009 to 2012 he served as Deputy of the LXI Legislature of the Mexican Congress representing Guanajuato, and previously served in the LX Legislature of the Congress of Guanajuato.

References

1969 births
Living people
Politicians from Guanajuato
People from Salamanca, Guanajuato
National Action Party (Mexico) politicians
21st-century Mexican politicians
Members of the Congress of Guanajuato
Deputies of the LXI Legislature of Mexico
Members of the Chamber of Deputies (Mexico) for Guanajuato